Ascención de Guarayos Airport  is an airport serving Ascención de Guarayos, a town in the Santa Cruz Department of Bolivia.

The Ascencion De Guarayos non-directional beacon (Ident: ASG) is located on the field.

See also

Transport in Bolivia
List of airports in Bolivia

References

External links 
OpenStreetMap - Ascención de Guarayos
OurAirports - Ascención de Guarayos
SkyVector - Ascención de Guarayos

Airports in Santa Cruz Department (Bolivia)